Henry F. Zwack (born December 5, 1952) is a lawyer and politician, most notable for having served as Rensselaer County, New York county executive and as an Acting New York State Supreme Court Justice.

Mr. Zwack is a graduate of Siena College in Loudonville, New York and the Albany Law School.  He hails from Stephentown, New York, where his father started a sheet metal fabrication business in the 1970s.

He began his political career in the Rensselaer County Legislature, eventually rising to Chairman.  In 1995, he was first appointed by the county legislature and then elected to serve out the term of the departing Rensselaer County executive and was reelected once before resigning to defend himself against corruption charges.  He was ultimately acquitted of all counts.

Governor George Pataki subsequently appointed him Executive Deputy Commissioner, New York State Office of Alcoholism and Substance Abuse Services (OASAS) and later as a Judge on the New York State Court of Claims in December, 2006.  He has chambers in Troy, New York, and is assigned in Rensselaer, Columbia and Ulster Counties as an Acting Supreme Court Justice.

References

1952 births
County executives in New York (state)
Living people
New York (state) lawyers
New York (state) Republicans
New York Supreme Court Justices
Siena College alumni
Albany Law School alumni
People from Stephentown, New York